The Rabbi Shalom Zaoui Synagogue (in Arabic: كنيس ربي شالوم الزاوي) is a synagogue located in the Mellah (Jewish quarter) of the medina of Rabat, Morocco.

The synagogue is located near Bab Diouana and contiguous to the Andalusian wall of the medina. It was named after Rabbi Shalom Zaoui (born circa 1839 and died circa 1918) who was respected and revered by his community, as it used to be his house.

Building 
The synagogue is accessible by a courtyard painted in bright red. It follows the Moorish architectural style that can be identified through the three-lobed shapes on the windows and the lamps similar to the lamps in mosques.

References 

Rabat
Synagogues in Morocco